RBA Prize for Crime Writing (Spanish: Premio RBA de Novela Policiaca) was a Spanish literary award said to be the world's most lucrative crime fiction prize at €125,000. It is funded by Barcelona-based multimedia publishing company .

Winners
2007 – Francisco González Ledesma, Una novela de barrio (A Neighborhood Novel)
2008 – Andrea Camilleri, La rizzagliata (The Death of Amalia Sacerdote)
2009 – Philip Kerr, If the Dead Rise Not 
2010 – Harlan Coben, Live Wire
2011 – Patricia Cornwell, Red Mist
2012 – Michael Connelly, The Black Box
2013 – Arnaldur Indriðason, Skuggasund (The Shadow District)
2014 – Lee Child, Personal
2015 – Don Winslow, The Cartel
2016 – Ian Rankin, Even Dogs in the Wild
2017 – Benjamin Black (pseudonym of John Banville), Snow
2018 – Walter Mosley, Down the River unto the Sea

References

External links
Premio RBA de Novela Negra, official website

Spanish literary awards
Awards established in 2007
2007 establishments in Spain
Mystery and detective fiction awards